Lunde Glacier is a glacier about  long flowing northwest between Håhellerskarvet and Jøkulkyrkja Mountain in the Mühlig-Hofmann Mountains on the Princess Astrid Coast of Queen Maud Land.

Discovery and naming
The glacier was mapped by Norwegian cartographers from surveys and air photos by the Sixth Norwegian Antarctic Expedition (1956–60) and named for T. Lunde, a glaciologist with the Norwegian expedition (1956–58).

See also
 Bakkesvodene Crags
 List of glaciers in the Antarctic
 Glaciology

References

External links
 Scientific Committee on Antarctic Research (SCAR)

Glaciers of Queen Maud Land
Princess Astrid Coast